New Zealand Americans are Americans who have New Zealand ancestry. According to the 2010 surveys, there are 19,961 New Zealand Americans. Most of them are of European descent, but some hundreds are of indigenous New Zealand descent. Some 925 of those New Zealand-Americans declared they were of Tokelauan origin. The 2000 Census indicated also the existence of 1,994 people of Māori descent in US.

History 
Many New Zealanders came to the United States after World War II. A significant portion (although not the majority) of these immigrants were war brides, because they had married U.S. servicemen who were stationed in the Pacific theater during the war. Since the 1940s, the majority of New Zealanders who have settled in the United States came seeking higher education or employment, especially in work related to finance, import and export, and entertainment industries.

Some small communities of New Zealanders have been created in the Chicago area and in the Green Bay and Madison, Wisconsin areas.

Notable people 
 Alex Aiono - singer, producer (New Zealander father)
 Peter Arnett - TV presenter (Originally from Riverton, New Zealand)
 Kerry Bishé - actress (Originally from New Zealand)
 Huntley Campbell - philosopher
 Ray Comfort - fundamentalist Christian evangelist
 Rachel Hunter - model, actress
 Phil Keoghan - host of The Amazing Race
 Stefania LaVie Owen - actress
 Sean Marks - retired basketball player and NBA executive
 Caelin Campbell -  archaeologist
 William Hayward Pickering - NASA chief
 Clive Revill - character actor
 George Silk - photojournalist
 Peter Snell - athlete
 Jeremy Waldron - university professor
 Martin Henderson - actor

See also

 Māori Americans
 American New Zealanders (for New Zealanders born in the United States or of American descent)

References

Further reading
 Knight, Judson. "New Zealander Americans." Gale Encyclopedia of Multicultural America, edited by Thomas Riggs, (3rd ed., vol. 3, Gale, 2014), pp. 289–299. Online

 
 
 
Oceanian American
United States